is a UK labour law case concerning the contract of employment. It held that promises to make no compulsory redundancies in a collective agreement were "aspirational" and not apt for being incorporated into individual contracts of employment. This meant that, aside from the collective agreement being unenforceable under the Trade Union and Labour Relations (Consolidation) Act 1992, section 179, the promises to employees could be broken.

Facts
The car manufacturer, MG Rover was in trouble. Mrs Kaur's contract said,

Her work place collective agreement was called 'The Way Ahead Partnership Agreement' signed in 1997, which in 'Job Security 2.1.' said the following.

Mrs Kaur was threatened with redundancy in 2003. She claimed an injunction against being dismissed.

Judgment
Keene LJ said that even when there were express words, the question was whether the context and character of the agreement made them apt for incorporation into individual contracts. Therefore, the agreement was not intended to create individual rights.

Jonathan Parker LJ and Brooke LJ agreed.

See also

Employment contract in English law
Autoclenz Ltd v Belcher [2011] UKSC 41
Nanjing Automobile (Group) Corporation

Notes

References

United Kingdom labour case law
Court of Appeal (England and Wales) cases
2004 in case law
2004 in British law
Rover Company
United Kingdom employment contract case law